Mount Pikapene is a national park located in New South Wales, Australia.

The part of the park that consists of tall moist rainforests, is dominated by gray gum, spotted gum, turpentine, pink bloodwood, and brush box.

The highest peak in the national park is Big Sugarloaf, rising 525 meters above sea level.

See also
 Protected areas of New South Wales

References

External links
 Draft plan of management for MPNP
 The MPNP portion of the Atlas of NSW Wildlife

National parks of New South Wales
Protected areas established in 1999
1999 establishments in Australia